"One Day in Your Life" is a song recorded by Michael Jackson for his 1975 album, Forever, Michael. Music written by Sam Brown III and Lyrics by Renée Armand, it was later released on March 25, 1981 as a single from the compilation album One Day in Your Life due to the commercial interest that generated from the sales of Jackson's hit 1979 album Off the Wall, despite the fact that Jackson had released that album on Epic Records instead of Motown.

While a modest US hit, it was a bigger hit in the UK, where it became Jackson's first solo recording to hit No. 1 on the UK Singles Chart. It was number one in the UK for two weeks in June and July 1981.  It also topped the Irish Singles Chart, and also featured strongly on the South African singles charts. It was released on the Motown label. It went on to become the sixth best-selling single of 1981 in the UK. Robert Christgau called this song a romantic ballad that is as credible on its "own terms as the rockers." Five years prior, a cover version by Johnny Mathis for his Feelings album charted in the U.S. and Canada.

Record World said that "Plush strings cushion Michael's heavenly vocals."

Charts

Johnny Mathis

Michael Jackson

Weekly charts

Year-end charts

Certifications
Michael Jackson version

References

1975 songs
1976 singles
1981 singles
Michael Jackson songs
Johnny Mathis songs
Irish Singles Chart number-one singles
Number-one singles in South Africa
UK Singles Chart number-one singles
Pop ballads
Rhythm and blues ballads
Motown singles